Tsu Kué 196G is an Indian reserve of the Smith's Landing First Nation in Alberta, located within the Regional Municipality of Wood Buffalo.

References

Indian reserves in Alberta